The Mising Autonomous Council (MAC), (sometimes Mishing), is an autonomous district council for the Mising people in Dhemaji District and Majuli District in the state of Assam in India, with its headquarters at Dhemaji. Its chairman is Paramananda Chayengia, who was elected in 2013, as a member of the inaugural democratically elected executive council of the MAC.

Members

Executive Councillors 

 Shri Sunil Kumar Pegu - Chairman
 Shri Joygeswar Kutum - Deputy Chairman
 Shri Paramananda Chayengia - Chief Executive Councilor
 Shri Uma Pathori - Executive Councilor Fishery and Market & Fair
 Smti Bhabani Duwarah - Executive Councilor for Social Welfare
 Raju Medok - Executive Councilor for Education, Library Service
 Shri Johan Doley - Executive Councilor for P&RD, Animal Husbandry & Veterinary
 Shri Purusuttam Doley - Executive Councilor for Health & Family Welfare, Land & Land Revenue
 Shri Prabhat Basumatary - Executive Councilor for P&RD, Tribal Research, Museum
 Roma Pait - Executive Councilor for Public Health Engineering
 Prabhat Basumary - Executive Councilor for PHE, Sports and Youth Welfare
 Shri Molendra Narzary - Executive Councilor for WPT & BC And Social Forestry
 Shri Naresh Kumbang - Executive Councilor for Water Resource And Cottage Industry
 Shri Biju Pegu - Executive Councilor for Minor Irrigation & Museum & Archaeology
 Shri Debaranjan Morang - Executive Councilor for Agriculture and Transport
 Shri Prasanta Kr. Bori - Executive Councilor for Cultural Affairs and Tourism
 Smti Indira Kumbang - Executive Councilor for Handloom Textiles and Sericulture

See also
 Mising Agom Kebang
 Takam Mising Porin Kebang
 Mising Baptist Kebang

References

Autonomous district councils of India
Year of establishment missing
Mising people
Dhemaji district